Leioproctus zephyr is a species of bee in the family Colletidae family that is native to Western Australia.

It was discovered by Kit Prendergast in 2022, who named the species after her dog Zephyr.

References

Colletidae
Hymenoptera of Australia
Insects described in 2022